Søre Ål Idrettslag is a Norwegian skiing club from Søre Ål, Lillehammer, Norway.

The club was founded in 1944.

Cross-country skiers Brit Pettersen Tofte and Thea Krokan Murud represented the club, so did the Nordic combined skiers Odd Arne Engh and Mikko Kokslien as well as the ski jumper Robert Johansson.

References

 Official site 

Sport in Lillehammer
Sports clubs established in 1944
1944 establishments in Norway
Ski jumping clubs in Norway